United States v. Olano, 507 U.S. 725 (1993), was a United States Supreme Court case that distinguished between forfeiture and waiver. Quoting from Johnson v. Zerbst, the Court noted, "Whereas forfeiture is the failure to make the timely assertion of a right, waiver is the "intentional relinquishment or abandonment of a known right.... Whether a particular right is waivable; whether the defendant must participate personally in the waiver; whether certain procedures are required for waiver; and whether the defendant's choice must be particularly informed or voluntary, all depend on the right at stake."

According to the Court, mere forfeiture, as opposed to waiver, does not extinguish an "error" under Rule 52(b) of the Federal Rules of Criminal Procedure. If a legal rule was violated during the District Court proceedings, and if the defendant did not waive the rule, then there has been an "error" within the meaning of Rule 52(b) despite the absence of a timely objection.

See also
 List of United States Supreme Court cases
 List of United States Supreme Court cases, volume 507
 List of United States Supreme Court cases by the Rehnquist Court

External links

1993 in United States case law
Federal Rules of Criminal Procedure case law
United States Supreme Court cases
United States Supreme Court cases of the Rehnquist Court